The Rangitane River is a short river of the Northland Region of New Zealand's North Island.

See also
List of rivers of New Zealand

References

Far North District
Rivers of the Northland Region
Rivers of New Zealand